Carolina Moscheni (born 23 May 1996) is a retired Italian ice dancer. With previous partner Francesco Fioretti, she was a two time Italian national silver medalist (2021,2022). With previous partner Andrea Fabbri, she was the 2019 Italian national bronze medalist. 

She previously represented Hungary, first with partner Ádám Lukács, with whom she placed fourteenth at the 2014 World Junior Championships; and subsequently, briefly, with Balázs Major.

Career 
In the 2010–11 season, Moscheni skated for Italy with Giorgio Savoldi on the novice level. The following season, she competed as a junior with Igor Ogay.

Moscheni teamed up with Hungarian ice dancer Ádám Lukács in May 2012. Barbara Fusar-Poli in Milan and Igor Shpilband in Novi, Michigan became their coaches.

Moscheni/Lukács began competing internationally for Hungary in the 2013–14 season. They won the 2014 Hungarian national junior title and were sent to the 2014 World Junior Championships in Sofia, Bulgaria. They qualified for the free dance and finished 14th overall.  On 30 August 2015, Moscheni and Lukács announced the end of their partnership. 

For the 2015–16 season, Moscheni competed with Balázs Major.  Moscheni/Major placed seventh at the 2015 CS Golden Spin of Zagreb, and twenty-seventh at the 2016 European Championships.  Following the European Championships, Moscheni and Lukács announced that they would resume skating together.  However, they did not return to competition.

Moscheni returned to her native Italy subsequently, and began competing with Andrea Fabbri in the 2017–18 figure skating season. They placed fourth at their first Italian national championships in Milan.

In the 2018-19 season, Moscheni/Fabbri won the bronze medal at the 2019 Italian Championships. This qualified them to compete at the 2019 European Championships. In Minsk, they placed twenty-first in the rhythm dance, missing the free dance by 0.72 points.
They ended their season at the Egna Dance Trophy in February, where they finished fourth overall.

Following the end of her partnership with Fabbri, Moscheni formed a new partnership with Francesco Fioretti.  In their debut season they won the silver medal at the Italian Championships, and placed twenty-fifth at the 2021 World Championships in Stockholm.

They were sixteenth at the 2021 CS Lombardia Trophy, their season debut. They were originally on the roster for the 2021 CS Nebelhorn Trophy, but were later replaced. After Italy was designated to host a special Gran Premio d'Italia on the 2021–22 Grand Prix, Moscheni/Fioretti were named as replacements for a withdrawn team to make their Grand Prix debut on home soil. They placed twelfth at the event. They were twenty-first at their inaugural European Championships appearance, missing the cut for the free dance. They finished the season twenty-sixth at the World Championships, missing the free dance there as well.

On July 17, 2022, Moscheni announced her retirement from figure skating.

Programs

With Fioretti

With Fabbri

With Major

With Lukács

Competitive highlights

For Italy

With Fioretti

With Fabbri

For Hungary

With Major

With Lukács  
JGP: Junior Grand Prix

With Savoldi and Ogay for Italy

References

External links 
 
 
 
 
 Carolina Moscheni / Igor Ogay at Tracings
 Carolina Moscheni / Giorgi Savoldi at Tracings

1996 births
Italian female ice dancers
Living people
Sportspeople from Bergamo
20th-century Italian women
21st-century Italian women